New College Ground is a cricket ground in Oxford, England. The ground is owned by New College, a constituent college of the University of Oxford. The ground operated as a first-class cricket venue from 1906 to 1927, hosting three first-class matches.

History
After the Magdalen Ground was established, a trend began where constituent colleges of the University of Oxford began to form enclosed cricket grounds. New College initially leased the land on which they played cricket from Christ Church. In the early 1880s, Alfred Robinson, a fellow of the college, established a cricket ground for New College on land south of the University Parks. Oxfordshire first played minor counties cricket at the ground against Wiltshire in the 1896 Minor Counties Championship. In both the 1900 and 1901 seasons, Oxfordshire played all of their home minor counties fixtures at the ground. Oxford University have played first-class cricket at the ground on three occasions. The first of these came in 1906 against the 1905 County Championship winners Yorkshire, while the second came the following season against the touring South Africans.

The ground was requisitioned by the War Office during the First World War, where it provided initial training for 17–18 years old cadets. To this end, trenches simulating those a soldier might encounter on the Western Front were dug on the ground. The ground regularly hosted parades the 1st Battalion, Oxfordshire and Buckinghamshire Light Infantry throughout the war. Following the end of the war, soldiers from the 1st Battalion filled in the trenches. The ground hosted its third first-class match in 1927, with Oxford playing the touring New Zealanders. Oxfordshire returned to the ground in 1939, playing all four of their homes matches in that seasons Minor Counties Championship there (a fifth, against Cornwall, was abandoned without a toss). During the Second World War, the ground was not requisitioned and inter-college cricket was played.

Records

First-class
Highest team total: 358 for 9 declared by Yorkshire v Oxford University 1906
Lowest team total: 84 all out by Oxford University v Yorkshire, as above
Highest individual innings: 169 by George Hirst for Yorkshire v Oxford University, as above
Best bowling in an innings: 7-35 by Schofield Haigh for Yorkshire v Oxford University, as above
Best bowling in a match: 10-58 by Schofield Haigh, as above

See also
List of Oxfordshire County Cricket Club grounds

References

External links
New College Ground at ESPNcricinfo

New College, Oxford
1880s establishments in England
University of Oxford sites
Sport at the University of Oxford
Cricket grounds in Oxfordshire
Oxfordshire County Cricket Club
Oxford University Cricket Club
Parks and open spaces in Oxford
Sports venues in Oxford
Oxfordshire and Buckinghamshire Light Infantry
University sports venues in the United Kingdom